The Tushino Constituency (No.207) is a Russian legislative constituency in Moscow. It is based in North-Western Moscow.

Members elected

Election results

1993

|-
! colspan=2 style="background-color:#E9E9E9;text-align:left;vertical-align:top;" |Candidate
! style="background-color:#E9E9E9;text-align:left;vertical-align:top;" |Party
! style="background-color:#E9E9E9;text-align:right;" |Votes
! style="background-color:#E9E9E9;text-align:right;" |%
|-
|style="background-color:"|
|align=left|Yury Vlasov
|align=left|Independent
|59,396
|23.13%
|-
|style="background-color:"|
|align=left|Konstantin Borovoy
|align=left|Independent
| -
|21.20%
|-
| colspan="5" style="background-color:#E9E9E9;"|
|- style="font-weight:bold"
| colspan="3" style="text-align:left;" | Total
| 256,845
| 100%
|-
| colspan="5" style="background-color:#E9E9E9;"|
|- style="font-weight:bold"
| colspan="4" |Source:
|
|}

1995

|-
! colspan=2 style="background-color:#E9E9E9;text-align:left;vertical-align:top;" |Candidate
! style="background-color:#E9E9E9;text-align:left;vertical-align:top;" |Party
! style="background-color:#E9E9E9;text-align:right;" |Votes
! style="background-color:#E9E9E9;text-align:right;" |%
|-
|style="background-color:#295EC4"|
|align=left|Konstantin Borovoy
|align=left|Party of Economic Freedom
|42,253
|14.34%
|-
|style="background-color:"|
|align=left|Yury Vlasov (incumbent)
|align=left|Independent
|35,450
|11.75%
|-
|style="background-color:"|
|align=left|Valery Shumakov
|align=left|Independent
|31,178
|10.34%
|-
|style="background-color:"|
|align=left|Andrey Akopyan
|align=left|Independent
|28,725
|9.52%
|-
|style="background-color:"|
|align=left|Tatyana Melnikova
|align=left|Communist Party
|19,460
|6.45%
|-
|style="background-color:#1A1A1A"|
|align=left|Konstantin Solovyov
|align=left|Stanislav Govorukhin Bloc
|18,663
|6.19%
|-
|style="background-color:"|
|align=left|Galina Leskova
|align=left|Environmental Party of Russia "Kedr"
|16,270
|5.39%
|-
|style="background-color:#FE4801"|
|align=left|Yury Shatalov
|align=left|Pamfilova–Gurov–Lysenko
|12,286
|4.07%
|-
|style="background-color:"|
|align=left|Valery Aleksin
|align=left|Independent
|10,672
|3.54%
|-
|style="background-color:#1C1A0D"|
|align=left|Igor Adarchenko
|align=left|Forward, Russia!
|10,214
|3.39%
|-
|style="background-color:#D50000"|
|align=left|Vladimir Gusev
|align=left|Communists and Working Russia - for the Soviet Union
|9,454
|3.13%
|-
|style="background-color:#2C299A"|
|align=left|Sergey Tsyplakov
|align=left|Congress of Russian Communities
|7,094
|2.35%
|-
|style="background-color:"|
|align=left|Lidia Maleeva
|align=left|Independent
|6,533
|2.17%
|-
|style="background-color:"|
|align=left|Larisa Vladimirova
|align=left|Independent
|3,867
|1.28%
|-
|style="background-color:"|
|align=left|Anatoly Kuntsevich
|align=left|Liberal Democratic Party
|3,848
|1.28%
|-
|style="background-color:"|
|align=left|Vladimir Gnezdilov
|align=left|Independent
|2,774
|0.92%
|-
|style="background-color:#F9E2E3"|
|align=left|Aleksandr Glod
|align=left|Tikhonov-Tupolev-Tikhonov
|2,258
|0.75%
|-
|style="background-color:#959698"|
|align=left|Aleksandr Grinin
|align=left|Derzhava
|1,753
|0.58%
|-
|style="background-color:"|
|align=left|Irina Lipinskaya
|align=left|Independent
|1,233
|0.41%
|-
|style="background-color:#000000"|
|colspan=2 |against all
|30,337
|10.06%
|-
| colspan="5" style="background-color:#E9E9E9;"|
|- style="font-weight:bold"
| colspan="3" style="text-align:left;" | Total
| 301,626
| 100%
|-
| colspan="5" style="background-color:#E9E9E9;"|
|- style="font-weight:bold"
| colspan="4" |Source:
|
|}

1999

|-
! colspan=2 style="background-color:#E9E9E9;text-align:left;vertical-align:top;" |Candidate
! style="background-color:#E9E9E9;text-align:left;vertical-align:top;" |Party
! style="background-color:#E9E9E9;text-align:right;" |Votes
! style="background-color:#E9E9E9;text-align:right;" |%
|-
|style="background-color:"|
|align=left|Aleksandr Shokhin
|align=left|Independent
|91,661
|28.81%
|-
|style="background-color:#3B9EDF"|
|align=left|Yevgeny Velikhov
|align=left|Fatherland – All Russia
|71,983
|22.62%
|-
|style="background-color:#1042A5"|
|align=left|Konstantin Borovoy (incumbent)
|align=left|Union of Right Forces
|27,115
|8.52%
|-
|style="background-color:#7C273A"|
|align=left|Yury Pankratov
|align=left|Movement in Support of the Army
|23,354
|7.34%
|-
|style="background-color:"|
|align=left|Konstantin Solovyov
|align=left|Independent
|18,437
|5.79%
|-
|style="background-color:"|
|align=left|Ivan Okhlobystin
|align=left|Environmental Party of Russia "Kedr"
|12,955
|4.07%
|-
|style="background-color:"|
|align=left|Sergey Glubokov
|align=left|Liberal Democratic Party
|4,397
|1.38%
|-
|style="background-color:#FF4400"|
|align=left|Anatoly Chekhovoy
|align=left|Andrey Nikolayev and Svyatoslav Fyodorov Bloc
|3,753
|1.18%
|-
|style="background-color:"|
|align=left|Aleksandr Inozemtsev
|align=left|Independent
|3,440
|1.08%
|-
|style="background-color:"|
|align=left|Aleksandr Demin
|align=left|Independent
|3,242
|1.02%
|-
|style="background-color:#084284"|
|align=left|Vladislav Tyshchenko
|align=left|Spiritual Heritage
|3,136
|0.99%
|-
|style="background-color:#000000"|
|colspan=2 |against all
|46,489
|14.61%
|-
| colspan="5" style="background-color:#E9E9E9;"|
|- style="font-weight:bold"
| colspan="3" style="text-align:left;" | Total
| 318,189
| 100%
|-
| colspan="5" style="background-color:#E9E9E9;"|
|- style="font-weight:bold"
| colspan="4" |Source:
|
|}

2003

|-
! colspan=2 style="background-color:#E9E9E9;text-align:left;vertical-align:top;" |Candidate
! style="background-color:#E9E9E9;text-align:left;vertical-align:top;" |Party
! style="background-color:#E9E9E9;text-align:right;" |Votes
! style="background-color:#E9E9E9;text-align:right;" |%
|-
|style="background-color:"|
|align=left|Vladimir Vasilyev
|align=left|United Russia
|64,871
|23.59%
|-
|style="background-color:"|
|align=left|Sergey Ivanenko
|align=left|Yabloko
|42,400
|15.42%
|-
|style="background-color:"|
|align=left|Mikhail Dvornikov
|align=left|Independent
|31,071
|11.31%
|-
|style="background-color:"|
|align=left|Yury Sinelshchikov
|align=left|Communist Party
|23,623
|8.59%
|-
|style="background-color:"|
|align=left|Aleksandra Ochirova
|align=left|Independent
|22,887
|8.32%
|-
|style="background-color:#FFD700"|
|align=left|Yury Vasilyev
|align=left|People's Party
|11,881
|4.32%
|-
|style="background-color:"|
|align=left|Mikhail Nenashev
|align=left|Independent
|7,354
|2.67%
|-
|style="background-color:#00A1FF"|
|align=left|Mikhail Sukhinin
|align=left|Party of Russia's Rebirth-Russian Party of Life
|4,291
|1.56%
|-
|style="background-color:#CACBFB"|
|align=left|Andrey Sharomov
|align=left|Union of People for Education and Science
|3,152
|1.15%
|-
|style="background-color:"|
|align=left|Maksim Gritsay
|align=left|Independent
|2,913
|1.06%
|-
|style="background-color:#164C8C"|
|align=left|Sergey Devichinsky
|align=left|United Russian Party Rus'
|1,413
|0.51%
|-
|style="background-color:#000000"|
|colspan=2 |against all
|53,954
|19.62%
|-
| colspan="5" style="background-color:#E9E9E9;"|
|- style="font-weight:bold"
| colspan="3" style="text-align:left;" | Total
| 276,282
| 100%
|-
| colspan="5" style="background-color:#E9E9E9;"|
|- style="font-weight:bold"
| colspan="4" |Source:
|
|}

2016

|-
! colspan=2 style="background-color:#E9E9E9;text-align:left;vertical-align:top;" |Candidate
! style="background-color:#E9E9E9;text-align:left;vertical-align:top;" |Party
! style="background-color:#E9E9E9;text-align:right;" |Votes
! style="background-color:#E9E9E9;text-align:right;" |%
|-
|style="background-color:"|
|align=left|Gennady Onishchenko
|align=left|United Russia
|41,041
|25.20%
|-
|style="background-color:"|
|align=left|Dmitry Gudkov
|align=left|Yabloko
|32,147
|19.74%
|-
|style="background-color:"|
|align=left|Igor Korotchenko
|align=left|Rodina
|28,248
|17.34%
|-
|style="background-color:"|
|align=left|Sergey Baburin
|align=left|Communist Party
|20,007
|12.28%
|-
|style="background-color:"|
|align=left|Ilya Sviridov
|align=left|A Just Russia
|10,655
|6.54%
|-
|style="background-color:"|
|align=left|Sergey Marusov
|align=left|Liberal Democratic Party
|9,864
|6.06%
|-
|style="background:;"| 
|align=left|Igor Vittel
|align=left|Party of Growth
|5,764
|3.54%
|-
|style="background:;"| 
|align=left|Pyotr Pakhomov
|align=left|Communists of Russia
|3,839
|2.36%
|-
|style="background:;"| 
|align=left|Aleksandr Shumsky
|align=left|Civic Platform
|3,083
|1.89%
|-
|style="background:#00A650;"| 
|align=left|Dmitry Chugunov
|align=left|Civilian Power
|1,925
|1.18%
|-
|style="background:"| 
|align=left|Eduard Bagirov
|align=left|Patriots of Russia
|1,042
|0.64%
|-
| colspan="5" style="background-color:#E9E9E9;"|
|- style="font-weight:bold"
| colspan="3" style="text-align:left;" | Total
| 162,876
| 100%
|-
| colspan="5" style="background-color:#E9E9E9;"|
|- style="font-weight:bold"
| colspan="4" |Source:
|
|}

2021

|-
! colspan=2 style="background-color:#E9E9E9;text-align:left;vertical-align:top;" |Candidate
! style="background-color:#E9E9E9;text-align:left;vertical-align:top;" |Party
! style="background-color:#E9E9E9;text-align:right;" |Votes
! style="background-color:#E9E9E9;text-align:right;" |%
|-
|style="background-color: " |
|align=left|Aleksandr Mazhuga
|align=left|United Russia
|79,355
|34.76%
|-
|style="background-color: " |
|align=left|Andrey Grebennik
|align=left|Communist Party
|56,581
|24.78%
|-
|style="background-color: "|
|align=left|Maria Ivanova
|align=left|New People
|20,873
|9.14%
|-
|style="background-color: "|
|align=left|Sergey Andropov
|align=left|Party of Pensioners
|14,751
|6.46%
|-
|style="background-color: " |
|align=left|Aleksey Tsyba
|align=left|A Just Russia — For Truth
|12,394
|5.43%
|-
|style="background-color: " |
|align=left|Irina Kopkina
|align=left|Yabloko
|11,240
|4.92%
|-
|style="background-color: " |
|align=left|Aleksandr Vasilyev
|align=left|Communists of Russia
|9,646
|4.22%
|-
|style="background-color: " |
|align=left|Svyatoslav Alyrin
|align=left|Liberal Democratic Party
|9,404
|4.12%
|-
|style="background: ;"| 
|align=left|Mikhail Misharin
|align=left|The Greens
|5,152
|2.26%
|-
|style="background-color: "|
|align=left|Mikhail Ponomarev
|align=left|Russian Party of Freedom and Justice
|4,084
|1.79%
|-
| colspan="5" style="background-color:#E9E9E9;"|
|- style="font-weight:bold"
| colspan="3" style="text-align:left;" | Total
| 228,313
| 100%
|-
| colspan="5" style="background-color:#E9E9E9;"|
|- style="font-weight:bold"
| colspan="4" |Source:
|
|}

Notes

Sources
206. Тушинский одномандатный избирательный округ

References

Russian legislative constituencies
Politics of Moscow